Lost Lake may refer to:

Communities
United States
Lost Lake, Mississippi, unincorporated community
Lost Lake, Wisconsin, unincorporated community

Lakes

Canada

British Columbia
Lost Lake near Abbotsford, see Chadsey Lake
Lost Lake (Mackenzie)  near Mackenzie, British Columbia
Lost Lake (Nanaimo)
Lost Lake (Powell River)
Lost Lake (Whistler)

Other provinces
Lost Lake (Ontario)
Lost Lake (Saskatchewan)
Lost Lake (Quebec)

United States

Alaska
Lost Lake Scout Camp
Lost Lake (Alaska)

Arkansas
Lost Lake, a lake in Clay County, Arkansas

California
Lost Lake (California) in the Desolation Wilderness area

Colorado
Lost Lake (Colorado)

Massachusetts
Lost Lake (Groton)
Lost Lake (Hampden County)

Michigan
Lost Lake (Clare County, Michigan) 
Lost Lake (Isabella County, Michigan)
Lost Lake (Presque Isle County, Michigan) 
Lost Lake Scout Reservation

Minnesota
Lost Lake (Minnesota)

Montana
Lost Lake (Carbon County, Montana) in Carbon County, Montana
Lost Lake (Chouteau County, Montana) in Chouteau County, Montana
Lost Lake (Flathead County, Montana) in Flathead County, Montana
Lost Lake (Lake County, Montana) in Lake County, Montana
Lost Lake (Lincoln County, Montata) in Lincoln County, Montana
Lost Lake (Mineral County, Montana) in Mineral County, Montana
Lost Lake (Missoula County, Montana) in Missoula County, Montana
Lost Lake (Sweet Grass County, Montana) in Sweet Grass County, Montana
Lost Lake (Stillwater County, Montana) in Stillwater County, Montana

Oregon
Lost Lake (Oregon), several lakes, including:
Lost Lake (Hood River County, Oregon)
Lost Lake (Santiam Pass, Linn County, Oregon)

South Dakota
Lost Lake (South Dakota), in Minnehaha County

Utah
Lost Lake (Wayne County)
Lost Lake (Wasatch County)
Lost Lake (Garfield County)
Lost Lake (Duchesne County)

Washington
Lost Lake (Snohomish County) 
Lost Lake (Mason County)

Wisconsin
Lost Lake (Dodge County) 
Lost Lake (Vilas County) 
Lost Lake (Oneida County) 
Lost Lake (Minocqua)
Lost Lake (Hurst)
Lost Lake (Sugar Camp)
Lost Lake (Lost Creek)
Lost Lake (Indian Creek)
Lost Lake (Marathon County) 
Lost Lake (Polk County) 
Lost Lake (Bayfield County)
Lost Lake (Shawano County)
Lost Lake (Florence County) 
Lost Lake (Door County) in Jacksonport, Wisconsin
Lost Lake (Marinette County)
Lost Lake (Iron County)
Lost Lake (Sherman) in Sherman, Iron County, Wisconsin
Lost Lake (Mercer) in Mercer, Wisconsin
Lost Lake (Burnett County)
Lost Lake (Jackson) in Jackson, Burnett County, Wisconsin
Lost Lake (Webb Lake) in Webb Lake, Wisconsin
Lost Lake (Rusk) in Rusk, Burnett County, Wisconsin
Lost Lake (Washburn County)
Lost Lake (Sawyer County)

See also
Long Lost Lake in Clearwater County, Minnesota
Little Lost Lake by Avery, Idaho
Lost Land Lake in Sawyer County, Wisconsin
Big Lost Lake in Beltrami County
East Lost Lake in Otter Tail County, Minnesota
West Lost Lake in Otter Tail County, Minnesota